In the run up to the 2022 Maltese general election, various organizations carried out opinion polling to gauge voting intention in Malta. Results of such polls are displayed in this article. Opinion polls have shown that, the governing Labour Party was indicated to win in the general election.

Opinion polls

Expressing a preference 

The values in the table below are derived by removing non-party responses (i.e. non-voters, "don't know", and "no reply"); as the margin is also recalculated, there may be slight differences in exact lead margins due to rounding.

Complete data

Preferred Prime Minister

Abela and Grech

Abela and Delia

Muscat and Delia

Notes

References 

Opinion polling for elections
Opinion polling in Malta